Naval trawlers are vessels built along the lines of a fishing trawler but fitted out for naval purposes; they were widely used during the First and Second World Wars. Some—known in the Royal Navy as "Admiralty trawlers"— were purpose-built to naval specifications, others adapted from civilian use. Fishing trawlers were particularly suited for many naval requirements because they were robust vessels designed to work heavy trawls in all types of weather, and had large clear working decks. A minesweeper could be created by replacing the trawl with a mine sweep.

History

Armed trawlers were also used to defend fishing groups from enemy aircraft or submarines. The smallest civilian trawlers were converted to danlayers.

Contemporary
Some nations still use armed trawlers for fisheries protection and patrol. The Indian Navy used naval trawlers for patrol duties during its involvement in the Sri Lankan civil war. North Korea has notoriously used armed trawlers as spy ships. In 2001 the Japanese sank a North Korean naval trawler after a six-hour battle known as the battle of Amami-Ōshima. Somali pirates have commandeered trawlers and armed them for attacking freighters off the Horn of Africa; the action of 18 March 2006 involved a naval trawler used by pirates. Other incidents involving pirate trawlers are the actions of 30 March 2010, and of 1 April 2010, in which one naval trawler was sunk and another captured by the Seychelles Coast Guard and a US Navy frigate.

Trawler classes

 
 
 
 
 
 Portuguese class
 
 
 Type 139

Around the world

Belgium
In the aftermath of the First World War, the Belgian Corps de Marine purchased several British war surplus naval trawlers. They were operational during the 1940 Battle of Belgium, and one of them, evacuated a large quantity of the National Bank's gold reserves to Britain shortly before Belgium's surrender.

Brazil
As with Portugal, the British Royal Navy had a number of trawler-type warships on order from Brazilian shipyards. With the declaration of war by Brazil against Germany in 1942 these vessels were transferred to the Brazilian Navy for anti-submarine and escort duties.

China
People's Liberation Army Navy (PLAN) uses naval trawlers as spy ships, as well as fishing when PLAN was allowed to conduct business activities to supplement the huge military expenditure. In addition, prior to Chinese economic reform, it was relatively easy for PLAN to commandeer private vessels for military use in emergency situations when everything was government-owned in planned economy, but this has become increasingly difficult to do after the reform due to private ownership. However, PLAN has to keep a very large number of auxiliary minesweepers to prepare for war, and as a result, when naval trawlers had retired from their intelligence gathering role, they were converted to auxiliary minesweepers and placed in operational reserve of PLAN. In addition, environmental problems have caused constant geological/geographical/hydrographical changes in Chinese waters, hence creating huge survey requirement, thus a number of these naval trawlers retired from their spy ship roles have also been converted to survey vessels to meet the extremely heavy hydrographic survey requirement. Chinese naval trawlers include Type 113, Type 801, Type 8105, Type 8101, Type 8154 and Type 792 naval trawlers.

France
The French Navy used trawlers requisitioned from civilian use in wartime. In the Second World War 480 trawler-type vessels were in service as auxiliary mine-sweepers, and a further 60 as auxiliary patrol vessels.

Germany
It also used a large number of Kriegsfischkutter, trawlers built after the 24m long model "G" of the scientifically developed fishing cutter models (seven "Reichsfischkutter"-models A to- G), redesigned for naval uses such as anti-submarine warfare, but intended for conversion to fishing vessel after the war.

The weather trawler programme was a major disaster for the German war effort; it has even been suggested that it was one of the major contributors to Germany's defeat. The British Royal Navy monitored and pursued them relentlessly, capturing or sinking many. The reason was not just the strategic importance of weather data, but that the trawlers were carrying Enigma encryption machines and information, which when captured helped the British to crack the Enigma code, enabling them to read Germany's secret communications; the Germans discontinued the use of weather trawlers as they were too vulnerable, though they had not understood how their weather missions compromised Enigma.

India
The Royal Indian Navy operated trawlers mostly for wartime coastal defence; more than 50 s were ordered, but only 22 were completed, with four more being destroyed before completion when their shipyards were overrun by the Japanese in Burma. The remaining 25 were cancelled. They were used for coastal anti-submarine patrols and mine-sweeping duties.

Japan

As the Second World War progressed, Japan commandeered some fishing vessels for use as picket boats. To augment these, and to replace losses, the Imperial Japanese Navy also ordered a group of 280 picket boats, built on trawler lines but to Navy specifications. This was the No.1 class auxiliary patrol boat, though ultimately only 27 were completed.

New Zealand

In World War II the Royal New Zealand Navy operated 35 minesweepers, including 20 purpose-built naval trawlers (13 Castle class, three Bird class four Isles class), five converted fishing trawlers, and ten converted merchant vessels.

Norway
Norway had a large fishing and whaling fleet industry. For the Second World War the Royal Norwegian Navy used six converted whalers and 22 other fishing vessels as minesweepers, and a further ten as patrol craft. After the occupation of Norway the Free Norwegian forces used fishing vessels for their clandestine Shetland bus operations in support of the Norwegian resistance.

Portugal
Though Portugal was neutral or non-belligerent throughout the Second World War, a number of steel and wooden-hulled vessels were built there to trawler design for the Royal Navy. These s were delivered in 1942, but further construction was halted after protests from Nazi Germany. Later, as Portugal became more closely involved with the western allies, Britain transferred a number of s to the Portuguese Navy as anti-submarine vessels.

Romania
Romania acquired three German KFK naval trawlers in 1943.

United Kingdom

During the First World War, the Royal Navy operated 627 "Admiralty Trawlers" which had been purpose-built, purchased from foreign countries, or acquired as prizes. A further 1,456 trawlers were hired and operated, together with many other kinds of small vessel, by the Auxiliary Patrol. Trawlers were mainly employed in minesweeping, anti-submarine patrols and as boom defence vessels. 266 of the hired trawlers were lost while on active service.

Before and during the Second World War, the Royal Navy ordered many naval trawlers to Admiralty specifications. Shipyards such as Smiths Dock Company that were used to building fishing trawlers could easily switch to building naval versions. As a bonus, the Admiralty could sell these trawlers to commercial fishing interests after the end of the war. In 1940 Lieutenant Richard Stannard was in command of the naval trawler  when he won the Victoria Cross for his actions from 28 April to 2 May 1940 at Namsos in the Norwegian campaign. HMT Arab survived 31 bombing attacks in five days.

During the 1982 Falklands War the Royal Navy hired a flotilla of five trawlers from Kingston-upon-Hull, which were hastily converted to minesweepers, as the Ton-class minesweepers then in service were unsuitable for the long voyage and the heavy seas of the South Atlantic. Although employed with the Task Force on various other auxiliary duties, after the Argentine surrender the trawlers were able to sweep ten naval mines which had been successfully laid in Port Stanley harbour; eleven others had failed to deploy or had broken adrift.

United States
The US Navy generally favoured custom-built warships to civilian conversions, but in the first months of World War II the acute shortage of vessels for coastal defence and anti-submarine work led to the formation of a mosquito fleet. Twenty steel-hulled and more than 40 wooden-hulled trawlers were commissioned as auxiliary minesweepers (AM designation), but confined to coastal waters and not rated for offensive or convoy escort duties. A further 70 tuna clippers were called up as minesweepers (Amc designation), ten as harbour patrol craft (YP) and 50 as coastal transports (APC). The United States Coast Guard requisitioned ten Boston fishing trawlers for the Greenland Patrol.

Gallery

See also

  - an armed trawler
 Tuman - Soviet naval trawler sunk in the Kildin Island engagement [August 4, 1941]
 Naval drifter
 Royal Naval Patrol Service

Notes

Reading

External links

 The Trawlers go to War
 Memorial site to a trawler skipper 
 The Battle of Mesco Point
 The Dover Convoys

Naval trawlers
Naval ships
Trawlers